Protected areas in Laos include:

 Bokeo Nature Reserve
 Buddha Park
 Dong Ampham National Biodiversity Conservation Area, 20,000 ha at lat. -4.60886 long. 35.780714
 Dong Hua Sao National Biodiversity Conservation Area, 110,000 ha at lat. -3.323514 long. 35.428993
 Hin Namno National Park, 82,000 ha at lat. -2.357313 long. 31.507423
 Khammouane Limestone (Phou Hinpoun) National Biodiversity Conservation Area, 150,000 acres as lat. -2.429963 long. 31.847983
 Nakai-Nam-Theun National Park, 353,200 ha at lat. -2.304345 long. 32.004689
 Nam Et National Biodiversity Conservation Area, 170,000 ha at lat. -2.412692 long. 31.327367
 Nam Ha East National Biodiversity Conservation Area, 69,000 ha at lat. -2.805032 long. 32.187725
 Nam Ha West National Biodiversity Conservation Area, 102,500 ha at lat. -2.881786 long. 36.210516
 Nam Kading National Biodiversity Conservation Area, 169,000 at lat. -4.51639 long. 38.287967
 Nam Kan, 77,500 ha at lat. -4.433866 long. 30.518165
 Nam Phoun (Poui) National Biodiversity Conservation Area, 191,200 lat. -3.04683 long. 32.47126
 Nam Phouy National Biodiversity Conservation Area
 Nam Theun river corridor 62,000 ha lat. -4.440153 long. 35.405817
 Nam Theun Extension National Biodiversity Conservation Area, 64,500 ha at lat. -3.174735 long. 32.124839
Nam Xam National Biodiversity Conservation Area, 70,000 ha lat. -3.50734 long. 31.021141
 Phou Dindeng National Biodiversity Conservation Area, 222,000 ha at lat. -3.387068 long. 31.297898
 Phou Kateup (Bolovens Northeast), 93,500 at lat. -4.609291 long. 32.90657
 Phou Kathong, 88,000 ha at lat. -3.155685 long. 37.318828
 Phou Khao Khouay National Biodiversity Conservation Area, 200,000 acres at lat. -3.42293 long. 36.076999
 Phou Loeuy National Biodiversity Conservation Area, 150,000 ha at lat. -3.759078 long. 31.576813
 Phou Theung, 113,000 ha at lat. -3.232386 long. 35.700428
 Phou Xang He National Biodiversity Conservation Area, 109,900 acrea at lat. -4.728078 long. 38.259023
Phou Xiang Thong National Biodiversity Conservation Area, 120,000 ha at lat. -4.904306 long. 30.053229
 Phu Luang (Bolovens Southwest), 62,000 ha at lat. -3.178873 long. 31.243207
 Xe Bang Nouane National Biodiversity Conservation Area, 150,000 ha at lat. -4.826313 long. 29.787151
 Xe Khampho, 78,000 ha at lat. -3.198554 long. 31.821379
 Xe Pian National Biodiversity Conservation Area, 240,000 ha at lat. -4.912331 long. 38.129758
Xe Xap National Biodiversity Conservation Area, 133,500 ha at lat. -3.499002 long. 32.112262

See also
 Geography of Laos
 Conservation in Laos
 Fauna of Laos
 Flora of Laos
 Wildlife of Laos